Limkheda railway station is a railway station in Dahod district of Gujarat State of India. It is under Ratlam railway division of Western Railway Zone of Indian Railways. It is located on New Delhi–Mumbai main line of the Indian Railways. Passenger, MEMU and Express trains halt here.

Major Trains

Following trains halt at Limkheda railway station in both direction:

 19019/20 Bandra Terminus - Dehradun Express
 12929/30 Valsad - Dahod Intercity Superfast Express
 19023/24 Mumbai Central - Firozpur Janata Express
 19309/10 Gandhinagar Capital - Indore Shanti Express

References

Railway stations in Dahod district
Ratlam railway division